M/V Clio, (formerly Le Levant and Tere Moana), is a cruise ship owned and operated by Grand Circle Cruise line. The ship was built at the Alstom Leroux shipyard in St. Malo, France in 1998.

History
The ship was originally built in 1998. She operated with Compagnie du Ponant as Le Levant until December 2012 when she was refurbished and transferred to Paul Gauguin Cruises, operating under the name Tere Moana. She now specialises in European, Caribbean, and Latin American cruises.

The name Tere Moana translates into Ocean Traveller in Tahitian.

In August 2015, Paul Gauguin Cruises sold the Tere Moana to Grand Circle Cruises. The ship was renamed Clio and began sailing for Grand Circle Cruises, under the flag of Malta in July 2016.

Facilities
Clio has two restaurants and two bars. She also features the Deep Nature Spa, a fitness center and a swimming pool.

Gallery
These are images of Clio in her previous livery as Le Levant.

As Tere Moana in Panama, February 2015

References

External links

 Official Website

Ships built in France
Ships of Compagnie du Ponant
1998 ships